Juan Ferrando Fenoll (born 2 January 1981) is a Spanish professional football manager who is the current head coach of Indian Super League club ATK Mohun Bagan.

Managerial career
After several injuries as a footballer, Ferrando started his managerial career at age 18. He graduated from the school of RCD Espanyol, where he was campus and methodological coordinator (fitness, tactical and technical football); and had his 'Prácticum' at FC Barcelona B. He then spent consecutive seasons managing CE Premià, Terrassa and Hospitalet.

In the 2012−13 season, he became part of the technical staff of La Liga club Málaga, being appointed head coach of the club's youth team. Then, in mid-June 2013, he joined Moldovan National Division champions Sheriff Tiraspol as assistant coach and in July he appointed as the head coach with whom he won the Moldovan Super Cup. As a manager of Sheriff Tiraspol, Ferrando led the Moldovans to the UEFA Champions League third qualifying round for the first time in their history. Failing to overcome Diamo Zagreb to further advance to the Group Stage, he managed to eliminate Vojvodina during the Europa League play-off Round, advancing Sheriff to the Europa League Group Stage for the 2nd time in club history. Playing against Tottenham, Anzhi and Tromsø, Sheriff finished third with 6 points, two short of qualification to the next phase. The day after, he was dismissed from Sheriff.

In 2014, Ferrando moved to Greece and took over management of Superleague side Ergotelis, but was fired after the two first matches of the 2014–15 season, having suffered two losses. Returning to Spain in 2015, he was hired by Cultural Leonesa finishing in 7th place. In 2017, Linares Deportivo relied on Ferrando for the last days of the 2016/17 league, but he could do little to prevent the team from being relegated. Shortly after Ferrando submitted his resignation for disagreements of sports planning, he was hired by newly formed Greek 3rd Division side Volos, whom he managed to consecutively promote to the 2nd and 1st Divisions in the following two years. Unfortunately, he had to leave Volos due to a bacterial eye infection which nearly blinded him. 

Oon 30 April 2020, after a full recovery, he was appointed as the head coach of Indian Super League club FC Goa. On 14 April 2021, he guided FC Goa to their first ever AFC Champions League point by any Indian team in a 0–0 draw against Al-Rayyan.

In 2021, he managed Goa at the 130th edition of Durand Cup and reached to the final, defeating Bengaluru FC 7–6 in sudden death. On 3 October, they clinched their first ever Durand Cup title defeating Mohammedan SC 1–0, which was his maiden trophy in India. On 20 December, Goa announced that Ferrando had stepped down as the head coach of the club by activating a release clause in his contract.

In a surprising turn of events Ferrando resigned from his position in Goa on 20 December 2021 to become the head coach of another ISL club ATK Mohun Bagan. He succeeded Antonio Lopez Habas in ATK Mohun Bagan and won the first match in his tenure 3–2 against NorthEast United FC.

As 2022–23 season began, his club appeared on 20 August against Rajasthan United at the 131st edition of Durand Cup, in which they were defeated by 3–2. But despite all odds he helped the club win the ISL title that season.

Managerial statistics

Honours
Sheriff Tiraspol
Moldovan Super Cup: 2013

Volos
Gamma Ethniki: 2017–18
Football League: 2018–19

FC Goa
Durand Cup: 2021

ATK Mohun Bagan
 Indian Super League: 2022–23

References

External links

 Official site
 Official Twitter
  Компенсированное Время. ТСВ. 10.09.2013
  Программа «Вне игры» 15/09/13

1981 births
Spanish football managers
Living people
People from Barcelona
Spanish expatriate football managers
Spanish expatriate sportspeople in Moldova
Expatriate football managers in Moldova
Expatriate football managers in Greece
Ergotelis F.C. managers
Cultural Leonesa managers
Volos FC managers
FC Sheriff Tiraspol managers
Indian Super League head coaches
FC Goa managers
ATK Mohun Bagan FC managers
Expatriate football managers in India
Spanish expatriate sportspeople in India